Dorothy Sidney may refer to:

Dorothy Sidney, Countess of Leicester (née Dorothy Percy) (ca. 1598 – 1659)
Dorothy Spencer, Countess of Sunderland (1617 – 1684), daughter of the above